Réka Bordás (born 26 August 1997) is a Hungarian handball player who plays for Debreceni VSC and the Hungarian national team. She competed in the 2020 Summer Olympics. 

Her father, József Bordás also played handball and represented Hungary on more than 100 occasions.

She made her international debut on 6 July 2021 against Montenegro.

References

External links

1997 births
Living people
People from Karcag
People from Kenderes
Handball players at the 2020 Summer Olympics
Hungarian female handball players
Olympic handball players of Hungary
Sportspeople from Jász-Nagykun-Szolnok County